Gordon Scrutton (31 December 1902 – 6 June 1966) was an Australian rules footballer who played with Sturt in the South Australian National Football League (SANFL).

On 5 May 1923, Gordon, alongside his siblings Clarrie and Stan, became part of the first trio of brothers to play for Sturt at the same time.

References 		
		

1902 births
1966 deaths
Sturt Football Club players
Australian rules footballers from South Australia